Nunsowe Green (or Greene) was the pseudonym for a 19th-century novelist. His best known work is A Thousand Years Hence (1882). Almost forgotten today, he is mentioned in the same breath with Jules Verne by a character in the novel The Saliva Tree (1964/65) by Brian Aldiss, which also refers to H. G. Wells.

References

British science fiction writers
19th-century British novelists
19th-century pseudonymous writers